Michelle A. Harris is an American politician who is the alderman of Chicago's 8th ward and the chair of the Chicago City Council's rules committee.

Early life and education
Harris was raised on the south side of Chicago where she attended Chicago Vocational High School and Chicago State University.

Aldermanic career
Harris began her aldermanic career in 2006. She was appointed by mayor Richard M. Daley to fill the vacancy left after Todd Stroger retired to become President of the Cook County Board of Commissioners. On December 13, 2006, Michelle Harris was confirmed as Alderwoman by the Chicago City Council and sworn in. Harris has subsequently been reelected in 2007, 2011, 2015, and 2019.

In 2014, she had expressed support for a proposed marijuana dispensary on 87th street and by 2015 had changed her opinion on the issue. Also in 2014, she was investigated by the Illinois Attorney General for violating Illinois' Open Meetings Act for failure to give adequate notice that two referendums were to be on a public meetings agenda. In 2015 she "demanded" along with 14 other African-American aldermen, that Mayor Rahm Emanuel fire Police Superintendent Garry McCarthy due to inefficacy in combating murders in her ward.

In an article titled "The Big Spenders—and What They Charged", Chicago magazine lists out the most egregious examples of luxurious spending of campaign contributions by Illinois politicians. Harris, for example, is cited for used her campaign account in the amount of $3,849 for airfare to Turkey in 2012.

In the runoff of the 2019 Chicago mayoral election, Harris endorsed Toni Preckwinkle against her opponent Lori Lightfoot. However, Harris has since served as Mayor Lightfoot's floor leader during her mayoralty, being a City Council ally of Lightfoot.

2016 clerk of the Circuit Court of Cook County campaign
In 2016, Harris challenged incumbent Dorothy A. Brown in the Democratic primary for Clerk of the Circuit Court of Cook County. Harris lost the primary, receiving 307,392 votes (30.53%) to Brown's 477,503 (47.43%), with the remaining 221,921 votes (22.04%) going to Jacob Meister.

Electoral history

References

External links
Aldermanic website

1961 births
21st-century American politicians
21st-century American women politicians
African-American city council members in Illinois
African-American women in politics
Chicago City Council members
Living people
Women city councillors in Illinois
Chicago City Council members appointed by Richard M. Daley
Illinois Democrats